Radwa Fadel El Aswad (Arabic: رضوى فاضل الأسود), born 1974, is an Egyptian writer, novelist, and critic.

Early life and education
Radwa Fadel El Aswad,, was born in Egypt in the Zeitoun neighborhood of Cairo, on January 20, 1974, the eldest daughter of the critic, researcher, and scriptwriter Fadel El Aswad.
 
graduated from the Notre Dame Des Apôtres the French nun school, then obtained a Bachelor of Arts, French Department, from Ain Shams University in 1996.

Career
She is an independent art and literary critic ، has published several articlesabout award-winning novels and books in Egyptian and Arabic newspapers and magazines.

Notable work

 
Bi-al-ams kuntu mayyitan : ḥikāyah ʻan al-Arman wa-al-Kurd | Novel
 
Published in 2020, by the Egyptian-Lebanese Publishing House, is a story about the Armenian Genocide, as well as History of the Kurds. The novel shows that politics corrupts the lives of peoples and religions, nominated for the Katara Prize for Arabic Novel
 

 
She is the author of two books and Six novels, one of which have been Featured in the ‘’Housaper’’ | the arevelk.am() is an Arabic daily newspaper, published in Cairo, Egypt, The novel known for its historical story that summarized the Armenian Genocide, as well as Kurdish history.

Works
 Hafl al-miʼawīyah | Novel، Bait El-yasmin for publishing, 2010
 Tashābuk | Novel، Dar alKitab al arabi for publishing, 2013
 Kullu Hādhā Al-ṣakhkhab | Novel، Maqam for publishing, 2015
 Adyān wa-ṭawāʼif majhūlah : jawhar ghāʼib wa-mafāhīm maghlūṭah | Book، Battana for publishing, 2018
 Zijzāj | Novel، Nahdet misr for publishing, 2018
 Bi-al-ams kuntu mayyitan : ḥikāyah ʻan al-Arman wa-al-Kurd | Novel، Egyptian-Lebanese Publishing House, 2020
 Sayyid Quṭb : riḥlah bayna ḍifāf usṭūrat al-tanāquḍāt | Book، Sama for publishing, 2022
 Khedāā Wāhed Momken | Novel، Dar Shorouq, 2022

See also
 List of Egyptian authors
 List of Egyptian writers

References

External links
Radwa El Aswad writes: "I have not talked yet about feminist writing"
 
Radwa El Aswad writes: ‘’You shine you illuminate’’ - The smooth transition between the past and the present for Author | Rasha Adly
 
About "Khedāā Wāhed Momken" The novel | Radwa El Aswad writes: Men under the weight of mental illness
 
Radwa El Aswad writes: "Elif Shafak and the Sufi philosophy of salvation"
 
Bil-ams kuntu mayyitan : hikâyat an al arman wal kurd | The novel
 

 

Ain Shams University alumni
Egyptian novelists
Egyptian women writers
1974 births
Living people